North Dakota state parks are state parks managed by the North Dakota Parks and Recreation Department.

State parks and recreation areas

References

External links
North Dakota Parks and Recreation North Dakota Parks and Recreation Department

North Dakota state parks
 
State parks